Pontarlier (Latin: Ariolica) is a commune and one of the two sub-prefectures of the Doubs department in the Bourgogne-Franche-Comté region in eastern France near the Swiss border.

History

Pontarlier occupies the ancient Roman station of Ariolica, in Gallia and is placed in the Tables on the road from Urba (modern Orbe, Canton Vaud, Switzerland), to Vesontio (modern Besançon). Although the distances in the Antonine Itinerary do not agree with the real distances, French geographer D'Anville recognized a transposition of the numbers. The Theodosian Tabula names the place "Abrolica", which William Smith states as a possible error of transcription.

After the Burgundian invasion in the 5th century, Pontarlier became an unavoidable way of trade from the kingdom of Burgundy to Switzerland, Germany or Lombardy. Until the 17th century it lay on the easiest way to cross Jura mountains.

Pontarlier is one of the staging posts from northern France, Britain and the Benelux countries for the Via Francigena, now a walking route to Rome with a starting point in Canterbury, England.  It is recorded as being the stop on day 57 of Sigeric the Serious, the then Archbishop of Canterbury on his return from Rome in 990 AD, having been given his pallium, or token of rank.  Discussion continues as to whether he came over the Jura from the direction of Yverdon-les-Bains to the south-east or through a valley from Jougne to the south.

The city of Pontarlier is briefly mentioned in Victor Hugo's Les Misérables. It was to this city that convict Jean Valjean was to report for his parole after being released from the galleys. Breaking these instructions is a major turning point in the novel, and also creates some major conflict for Valjean later in the story. The city is also the main location of the 1962 French film The Seventh Juror.

Pontarlier was famous for the production of absinthe until its ban in 1915.  The distilleries switched over to producing a particular type of pastis, the "Pontarlier".  With the ban partially lifted in the 1990s, Pontarlier distilleries are once again producing absinthe.

Population

Transportation
The commune has a railway station, on the Frasne–Les Verrières and Neuchâtel–Pontarlier lines between France and Switzerland.

Notable people

 Sébastien Rale (1652-1724), missionary and lexicographer 
 Charles Antoine Morand, Napoleonic general
 , distiller 
 Edgar Faure, member of the Académie française, president of the city council, and mayor
 Philippe Grenier, physician and first Muslim member of French parliament
 Xavier Marmier, writer and poet
 Robert Fernier, painter
 , painter
 Vincent Defrasne, biathlete
 Florence Baverel-Robert, biathlete

Sights

 Triumphal arch of the Porte Saint-Pierre (18th century)
 Stained glass created in 1976 by painter Alfred Manessier for Saint-Bénigne Church
 Fort de Joux (between 11th and 19th century)

International relations

Pontarlier is twinned with:
  Yverdon-les-Bains, Switzerland
  Villingen-Schwenningen, Germany
  Zarautz, Spain

See also
 Communes of the Doubs department

References

External links

 City council website 
 Aeroclub of Pontarlier WebSite 

Communes of Doubs
Subprefectures in France
Sequani